Thomas William Chapple (February 10, 1853 – 1926) was an Ontario lawyer and political figure. He represented Ontario North in the Legislative Assembly of Ontario from 1894 to 1898 as a Liberal member.

He was born in Kilkenny, Ireland in 1853, the son of William Chapple, a captain in the British Army. He was educated in London and in Newcastle, Ontario. He was called to the Ontario bar and set up practice in Uxbridge. Chapple was named judge for the Rainy River District in 1898, serving until his death.

The township of Chapple in Rainy River District was named in his honour.

External links 

The Canadian parliamentary companion, 1897 JA Gemmill
County of Ontario: short notes ..., JEC Farewell

1853 births
1926 deaths
Irish emigrants to Canada (before 1923)
Judges in Ontario
Ontario Liberal Party MPPs
People from Uxbridge, Ontario
Politicians from County Kilkenny